Quirnbach may refer to two municipalities in Rhineland-Palatinate, Germany:

Quirnbach, Kusel (also Quirnbach/Pfalz), in the district of Kusel
Quirnbach, Westerwaldkreis, in the district Westerwaldkreis